This is a round-up of the 1989 Sligo Senior Football Championship. St. Patrick's, Dromard retained the title, their seventh and last to date, after repeating the previous year's final's outcome - a one-point defeat of Tubbercurry. Geevagh and Innisfree Gaels, an amalgamation of St. Michael's and Calry, reached the semi-finals, the only time either side managed this feat.

First round

Quarter finals

Semi-finals

Sligo Senior Football Championship Final

References

 Sligo Champion (July–September 1989)

Sligo Senior Football Championship
Sligo Senior Football Championship